Carlos Miguel Aysa González (born August 21, 1950), is a Mexican politician, interim Governor of Campeche from 2019 to 2021. He studied a law degree from Universidad La Salle.

Early years 
Carlos Miguel Aysa González was born on August 21, 1950 in Palizada, Campeche. He studied a law degree at La Salle University in Mexico City from 1972 to 1977.

Political career 
In 1994, he was appointed as Deputy in the Congress of Campeche representing Palizada Municipality. From July 1, 2004 to September 15, 2009 he served as Secretary of Public Security of the State of Campeche.

On June 14, 2017 he was designated as General Secretary of Interior of Campeche.

Governor of Campeche 
On June 13, 2019, then governor Alejandro Moreno Cárdenas requested to leave from office to the Congress of Campeche, who chose Aysa González as substitute governor, with the vote in favor of 32 of 35 deputies present.

References 

1950 births
Living people
Institutional Revolutionary Party politicians
20th-century Mexican politicians
21st-century Mexican politicians
Governors of Campeche
Politicians from Campeche
Members of the Congress of Campeche